The Shawnee Lookout Archeological District is a historic district in the southwestern corner of the U.S. state of Ohio. Thirty-four of these sites are located in the  Shawnee Lookout Park, which has been called one of the most beautiful parks in southwestern Ohio.

The combination of river bottoms and wooded hillsides in Shawnee Lookout made it a highly attractive site for prehistoric settlement. As a result, the lands included in the district have a long record of aboriginal residency: artifacts found in the district's sites span a range of ten thousand years. These artifacts represent many cultures, including various Archaic peoples, the Hopewell tradition, and other Woodland period peoples. Among the artifacts found at one of the sites are a wide range of biological remains, such as bird bones, fish bones, walnuts, turtle shells, and deer bones. In recognition of the archaeological value of the sites composing the district, Shawnee Lookout was listed on the National Register of Historic Places in 1974.

References

Archaeological sites in Hamilton County, Ohio
Archaeological sites on the National Register of Historic Places in Ohio
Archaic period in North America
Historic districts on the National Register of Historic Places in Ohio
National Register of Historic Places in Hamilton County, Ohio
Ohio Hopewell